Houmayoun Mahmoudi / Homayoun Mahmoudi born 1966 Tehran, is an Iranian/British Cartoonist, Graphic Artist and Designer. He studied Graphic Design at the University of Tehran and graduated in Animation from the Tarbiat Modares University. Skilled in his own style of Minimal Cartoon, he has his own technique of working on sandpapers.
Mahmoudi is married to Nooshin Moradi Fashion Artist, moved to The United Kingdom in 2004 and worked as a freelance Designer and International Artist. He is currently doing PhD research in Art and Design at Manchester Metropolitan University.
He has won numerous International cartoon contests around the world since 1994 and his Artworks are exhibited in The Modern Art Exhibitions globally. 
In 1998 Graphis magazine interviewed Houmayoun and published his Artworks and between 1999– 2006 he was working with the Ritzenhoff Design company as a member of their artist team.

Awards
 1994: Cesare Marcorelli prize for The Poster Design "Peace" Biennial of Art in Tolentino, Italy.
 1994: Second prize of The Poster design "Our Heritage", Tehran.
 1995: 3rd place of The United Nation (UN) Art festival for The Poster design of "Our families in the world" and 
 1995: The winner of The UNFPA Poster Competition "Women's Equality".
 1996: Special award Of cartoon contest "United nation" "The pollution in the World".
 1997: Sandro Carlesso Prize from Marostica International Cartoon Festival, Italy "Fashion and fashions".
 1998: Second place of The International Arms Race Cartoon Of Cuba  "Against Nuclear War in The World". 
 1999: First place of "Counter Narcotics" Cartoon Festival", Tehran.
 1999: Second place of "Anti war Cartoon festival" Of Brazil.
 2003: Second place of The International Cartoon Biennial of Tehran.
 2006: Sandro Carlesso award of Marostica "Dream", Italy.
 2006: First prize of The International cartoon festival of Bursa (Turkey) "The Pollution" 
 2007: Special prize of The International Cartoon festival of Poland  "Cold and Heat". 
 2010: Special prize of The Cartoon festival of Andromeda "Land", Italy.
 2010: 3rd place of International Cartoon Festival (Nasreddin Hodja) "The Global Warming" 
 2011: Grand prize of The International cartoon Festival of Marostica "Internet" (Italy).
 2011: Second place of The Tolentino Biennial of Cartoon Festival, Italy "Art of the Twentieth Century".
 2011: Third prize of The Cultural Council of Boechout, George Van Raemdonck Kartoenale "Trains and Stations" , Belgium.
 2012: Special prize of The International Cartoon Festival of Tehran "The Productivity".
 2012: Grand prize of The International cartoon festival "Awakening".
 2012: Honourable Prize of The International Cartoon Contest "Return to Home", Tehran. 
 2012: Special prize from The cartoon festival of Marostica (Italy) "Travel" 
 2012: Fourth place of The International Tehran Cartoon Festival "Oil".
 2013: Special Award of 18th Zagreb International Cartoon Exhibition "Funny side of horror"  
 2013: The Satyrykon's Andrzej Tomiałojć Foundation award "Peace", Poland. 
 2013: Honorable Mention of 15th Portocartoon World Festival "Liberty" 
 2013: Honorable Mention of Don Quichotte International Cartoon Festival "Citizenship".
 2014: The Mayor of the City of Legnica Award from The Satyrykon cartoon Competition, Poland.
 2014: The International Award "UMORISTI A MAROSTICA" Of The 46th International Graphic Humour Exhibition (The Theme: "RIGHTS"), Italy.
 2015: The Excellency Special Honor Diploma and a Personal Gallery on Best Cartoons, Romania.

Exhibitions 
 Hellenic Ministry of Culture Gallery Athens 2006
 Portuguese Printing-Press Museum 2007
 Museum of Kosovo 2007
 Warsaw Railway Museum 2011
 Kurtukunst Gallery of Berlin 2013

References

1966 births
Living people
Iranian cartoonists
British cartoonists
People from Tehran